Malcom Nahuel Braida (born 17 May 1997) is an Argentine professional footballer who plays as a winger for San Lorenzo.

Career
After coming through the ranks at Bochas Sport, Braida went to Instituto's academy in 2008. He was moved into their first-team squad under manager Claudio De María, who selected him for matches against Nueva Chicago and Argentinos Juniors in July 2017. Braida subsequently scored two goals, including his career first over Juventud Unida, across ten appearances in the following 2017–18 campaign. A further forty-five appearances would follow across the next two seasons, prior to Braida departing on loan in September 2020 to Primera División side Aldosivi.

On 20 January 2022, Braida joined San Lorenzo on a deal until the end of 2024.

Personal life
Braida is of Italian descent, with his forename Malcom being a tribute to his grandparents.

Career statistics
.

References

External links

1997 births
Living people
Sportspeople from Córdoba Province, Argentina
Argentine people of Italian descent
Argentine footballers
Association football midfielders
Primera Nacional players
Instituto footballers
Aldosivi footballers
San Lorenzo de Almagro footballers